Hemimyzon ecdyonuroides is a species of hillstream loach (a ray-finned fish) in the genus Hemimyzon. It is known from two tributaries of the Mekong, from Sekong River and Sesan River drainages in Vietnam and Laos.

References

 

Hemimyzon
Fish of the Mekong Basin
Fish of Laos
Fish of Vietnam
Taxa named by Jörg Freyhof
Taxa named by Fabian Herder
Fish described in 2002